Rasa Bandzienė (née Kartanaitė, born 5 July 1961) is a Lithuanian chess player. She is three times winner of Lithuanian Women's Chess Championship (1978, 1979, 1983).

Biography 
Rasa is daughter of the ten-time Lithuanian Women's Chess Championship Marija Kartanaitė, wife of chess International Master (IM) Algirdas Bandza.

She is champion of the Lithuanian Women's Chess Championship in 1978, 1979 and 1983 (in 1978 she shared 1st-2nd places with the out-of-competition Leili Pärnpuu; in 1979 she took 8th place, all the participants who were higher performed out of the competition). Silver medalist of the championships of the Lithuanian Women's Chess Championships in 1977 and 1984 (in 1977 she shared 2nd-3rd places with Vilhelmina Kaušilaitė-Kutavičienė following the out-of-competition chess candidate of master from Moscow N. Orlova, lost the gold medal in additional indicators; in 1984 she took 3rd place, but received a silver medal, since the winner of the tournament Tamar Khmiadashvili performed out of competition). She is bronze medalist of the Lithuanian Women's Chess Championships in 1981 and 1982. (in 1981 she shared 2nd-3st places, lost silver in additional indicators; in 1982 she took 8th place, 5 out of 7 participants who took places above were out of competition).

She is silver medalist of the Lithuanian Championship in 1996.

With the Lithuanian SSR national team, she was a participant in Spartakiad of the Peoples of the USSR in 1979 and 1983.

With the Žalgiris team, she was a participant in the USSR Team Chess Championship in 1980.

As member of the Lithuanian National Chess Team she was participant of the Chess Olympiad in 1996 and European Team Chess Championship in 1992.

After 1996, she does not compete in high-level chess tournaments.

References

External links 

1961 births
Living people
Lithuanian female chess players
Soviet female chess players
Chess Olympiad competitors